Bhrikuti Municipality is a municipality in Kapilvastu District in Lumbini Province of Nepal that was established on 19 September 2015 by merging the two former Village development committees Budhi, Hariharpur, Rajpur and Barakulpur. The administrative center of the municipality lies in the former Budhi VDC of Hanuman Bazaar area. At the time of the 2011 Nepal census it had a population of 26,282 people. The municipality is named after Bhrikuti, the first wife of the earliest emperor of Tibet.

References

Municipalities in Lumbini Province
Populated places in Kapilvastu District
Nepal municipalities established in 2015
Former municipalities of Nepal